Paul Ryan (born 23 May 1962) is a former Australian rules footballer who played with Collingwood in the Victorian Football League (VFL).

Ryan, a Hamilton recruit, played six senior games for Collingwood, all in the 1982 VFL season.

References

External links
 
 

1962 births
Australian rules footballers from Victoria (Australia)
Collingwood Football Club players
Living people